This is a list of banks operating in Albania.

Central bank

Commercial banks

References

External links 
 Albanian Association of Banks
 Albanian Banks SWIFT codes

Albania
 
Banks
Banks
Albania